State Highway 156 (SH 156) is a short Texas state highway running between Coldspring and Point Blank. This route runs along the western side of Lake Livingston and mostly is within the Sam Houston National Forest. The route was designated on March 19, 1930 along its current route, replacing part of a branch of SH 45.

Junction list

References

156
Transportation in San Jacinto County, Texas